William H. Briscoe (circa 1864 – )  was an English footballer who played in The Football League for Everton.

Early career
William Briscoe signed for Everton in August 1886. He appeared in all five forward–line positions for the Blues - scored 25 goals in 66 games during his first two seasons with Everton, appearing in the club's first–ever FA Cup tie against Bolton Wanderers in October 1887.

Season 1888–89
Briscoe, playing as a forward, made his League debut on 13 October 1888 at Trent Bridge, the then home of Notts County. The home team won 3–1. Briscoe appeared in three of the 22 League matches played by Everton in season 1888–89. However, unfortunately, he failed to establish himself in the side when League football was introduced, making just three appearances, as referred to above. He left Everton in May 1889.

References

English footballers
Everton F.C. players
English Football League players
Year of death missing
1860s births
Association football forwards